Kingsey is a small village and civil parish in Aylesbury Vale district in Buckinghamshire, England. It is near the boundary with Oxfordshire, about two miles east of Thame and a mile south of Haddenham.

The village toponym is of 12th-century origin and means 'king's island', referring to a piece of dry land that belonged to the king in the marshes that were once common in this part of the country.  In 1174 the village was called Eya, meaning 'island', though by 1192 it had gained its more modern name of Kingesie.  This leads historians to believe that the village is named after King Richard I of England.

Kingsey was transferred to Buckinghamshire from Oxfordshire in 1933, effectively being swapped for Towersey.

Historically people from this village and those surrounding it were known by the derogatory term 'wetfeet', because of the high water table of the area leading to the ground being so waterlogged.

Grade 1 listed Tythrop Park in Kingsey is listed as having an early duck decoy similar to that in Boarstall Duck Decoy in Buckinghamshire. (Location map)

References

External links

 About Kingsey
Detailed history of Kingsey, British History Online
 Tythrop House Duck Decoy listing in "The Book of Duck Decoys" by Sir Ralph Payne-Gallwey, 1886.

Villages in Buckinghamshire
Civil parishes in Buckinghamshire